Ali Meçabih (born 2 April 1972) is an Algerian former footballer. He played as a striker.

History
Born in Hammam Bou Hadjar, Ain Temouchent District, he was formed in US Hammam Bou Hadjar. He started playing in seniors with CR Témouchent but he played most of his career with MC Oran.

Career statistics

International goals 
Scores and results list Algeria's goal tally first. "Score" column indicates the score after the player's goal.

Honours

Club
'''MC Oran
 Algerian Cup: 1996
 Algerian League Cup: 1996
 Arab Cup Winners' Cup: 1997, 1998
 Arab Super Cup: 1999

International
 Has 28 caps (14 goals) for the Algerian National Team
 Played twice in the African Cup of Nations: 1996, 2000

References

1972 births
Living people
People from Hammam Bou Hadjar
Association football forwards
Algerian footballers
Algerian expatriate footballers
Algeria international footballers
CR Témouchent players
ES Mostaganem players
MC Oran players
USM Alger players
Ligue 2 players
Grenoble Foot 38 players
FC Martigues players
1996 African Cup of Nations players
2000 African Cup of Nations players
CS Constantine players
USM Blida players
Expatriate footballers in France
Algerian expatriate sportspeople in France
21st-century Algerian people